The 2022 Super Rugby Aupiki season is the inaugural season of Super Rugby Aupiki. The competition commenced on 10 March between Chiefs Manawa and Matatū. On 20 March, Chiefs Manawa were crowned as the inaugural champions of Super Rugby Aupiki after defeating the Blues Women 35–0 in the final round of the competition.

Teams

Format 
All four teams will get three regular season matches; one home, one away, and one Super Round fixture. The top two teams will contest the final.

The competition was later reformatted to a round robin fixture due to the impact of the COVID-19 pandemic. All the squads were strongly affected with player isolations and COVID-19 cases. The inaugural champion would be crowned based on their competition points.

Standings

Matches

Round 1

Round 2

Round 3

Players

Squads

Notes

References 

2022
2022 in New Zealand women's sport
2022 in women's rugby union
2022 in New Zealand rugby union